Svay Pao is a khum (commune) of Battambang District in Battambang Province in north-western Cambodia.

Villages

 Preaek Moha Tep
 Kampong Krabei
 Mphey Osakphea
 Kammeakkar

References

Communes of Battambang province
Battambang District